The 1997 ATP Tour was the elite tour for professional tennis organised by the ATP that year. The ATP Tour included the four Grand Slam tournaments, the ATP Tour World Championships, the ATP Super 9, the Championship Series and the World Series tournaments.

Schedule 
The tables below summarises the results for the 1997 ATP Tour.

Key

January

February

March

April

May

June

July

August

September

October

November

ATP rankings

Statistical information 
List of players and singles titles won:
  Julian Alonso - Santiago (1)
  Hicham Arazi - Casablanca (1)
  Alberto Berasategui - Palermo (1)
  Jonas Björkman - Auckland, Indianapolis, Stockholm (3)
  Michael Chang - Memphis, Indian Wells Masters, Hong Kong, Orlando, Washington, D.C. (5)
  Francisco Clavet - Mexico City, Bogotá (2)
  Àlex Corretja - Estoril, Rome Masters, Stuttgart (3)
  Albert Costa - Barcelona, Marbella (2)
  Jim Courier - Doha, Los Angeles, Beijing (3)
  Filip Dewulf - Kitzbühel (1)
  Slava Doseděl - Amsterdam (1)
  Thomas Enqvist - Marseille (1)
  Marcelo Filippini - Atlanta, St. Poelten (2)
  Richard Fromberg - Bucharest (1)
  Magnus Gustafsson - Singapore (1)
  Tim Henman - Sydney, Tashkent (2)
  Goran Ivanišević - Zagreb, Milan, Vienna (3)
  Thomas Johansson - Copenhagen, St. Petersburg (2)
  Yevgeny Kafelnikov - Halle, New Haven, Moscow (3)
  Nicolas Kiefer - Toulouse (1)
  Petr Korda - Stuttgart Masters (1)
  Ján Krošlák - Shanghai (1)
  Karol Kučera - Ostrava (1)
  Gustavo Kuerten - French Open
  Richard Krajicek - Rotterdam, Tokyo, Rosmalen (3)
  Félix Mantilla - Bologna, Gstaad, Umag, San Marino, Bournemouth (5)
  Andrei Medvedev - Hamburg Masters (1)
  Carlos Moyà - Long Island (1)
  Thomas Muster - Dubai, Miami Masters (2)
  Magnus Norman - Båstad (1)
  Mark Philippoussis - Scottsdale, Munich, London (3)
  Cédric Pioline - Prague (1)
  Patrick Rafter - US Open (1)
  Marcelo Ríos - Monte Carlo Masters (1)
  Marc Rosset - Antwerp (1)
  Greg Rusedski - Nottingham, Basel (2)
  Pete Sampras - Australian Open, San Jose, Philadelphia, Wimbledon, Cincinnati Masters, Paris Masters, Season-Ending Championships, Grand Slam Cup (8)
  Fabrice Santoro - Lyon (1)
  Sargis Sargsian - Newport (1)
  Sjeng Schalken - Boston (1)
  Jason Stoltenberg - Coral Springs (1)
  Mikael Tillström - Chennai (1)
  Todd Woodbridge - Adelaide (1)
  Chris Woodruff - Canada Masters (1)

Titles won by nation:
  16 (Doha, Australian Open, San Jose, Memphis, Philadelphia, Indian Wells Masters, Hong Kong, Orlando, Wimbledon, Washington, D.C., Los Angeles, Canada Masters, Cincinnati Masters, Beijing, Paris Masters, Season-Ending Championships)
  15 (Estoril, Barcelona, Rome Masters, Bologna, Gstaad, Stuttgart, Umag, San Marino, Long Island, Marbella, Bournemouth, Palermo, Mexico City, Bogotá, Santiago)
  9 (Auckland, Marseille, Copenhagen, St. Petersburg, Chennai, Båstad, Indianapolis, Singapore, Stockholm)
  7 (Adelaide, Scottsdale, Munich, Coral Springs, London, US Open, Bucharest)
  4 (Sydney, Nottingham, Tashkent, Basel)
  4 (Rotterdam, Tokyo, Rosmalen, Boston)
  3 (Zagreb, Milan, Vienna)
  3 (Halle, New Haven, Moscow)
  2 (Dubai, Miami Masters)
  2 (Amsterdam, Stuttgart Masters)
  2 (Prague, Lyon)
  2 (Shanghai, Ostrava)
  2 (Atlanta, St. Poelten)
  1 (Newport)
  1 (Kitzbühel)
  1 (French Open)
  1 (Monte Carlo Masters)
  1 (Toulouse)
  1 (Casablanca)
  1 (Antwerp)
  1 (Hamburg Masters)

The following players won their first career title:
  Julian Alonso - Santiago
  Hicham Arazi - Casablanca
  Jonas Björkman - Auckland
  Tim Henman - Sydney
  Thomas Johansson - Copenhagen
  Nicolas Kiefer - Toulouse
  Gustavo Kuerten - French Open
  Magnus Norman - Båstad
  Fabrice Santoro - Lyon
  Sargis Sargsian - Newport
  Mikael Tillström - Chennai
  Chris Woodruff - Canada Masters

See also 
 1997 WTA Tour

External links 
 Association of Tennis Professionals (ATP) official website
 1997 ATP Results Archive

 
ATP Tour
ATP Tour seasons